Francis Poulenc's Concerto pour deux pianos (Concerto for Two Pianos and Orchestra) in D minor, FP 61, was composed over the period of three months in the summer of 1932. It is often described as the climax of Poulenc's early period. The composer wrote to the Belgian musicologist Paul Collaer: "You will see for yourself what an enormous step forward it is from my previous work and that I am really entering my great period." The concerto was commissioned by and dedicated to the Princess Edmond de Polignac, an American-born arts patron to whom many early-20th-century masterpieces are dedicated, including Stravinsky's Renard, Ravel's Pavane pour une infante défunte, Kurt Weill's Second Symphony, and Satie's Socrate. Her Paris salon was a gathering place for the musical avant-garde.

Premiere
The premiere was given on September 5, 1932, at the International Society for Contemporary Music in Venice. Poulenc and his childhood friend Jacques Février were concerto soloists with the La Scala Orchestra, with Désiré Defauw (later conductor of the Chicago Symphony Orchestra) conducting. Poulenc was gratified by the warm acclaim his work received, and later performed the concerto with Benjamin Britten in England in 1945.

Inspirations
The concerto's recurring moto perpetuo, modally inflected figurations are clearly inspired by Poulenc's encounter with a Balinese gamelan at the 1931 Exposition Coloniale de Paris. Additionally, the work's instrumentation and "jazzy" effects are reminiscent of Ravel's G major Concerto, which was premiered at Paris in January 1932. Inevitably, comparisons have been drawn with Mozart's Concerto in E-flat for two pianos, K. 365, but the Larghetto's graceful, classically simple melody and gentle, regular accompaniment is reminiscent of the Romanze of Mozart's D minor Piano Concerto, K. 466. The composer admitted that he chose for the opening theme to go back to Mozart because "I have a veneration for the melodic line and because I prefer Mozart to all other composers". Poulenc wrote in a letter to Igor Markevitch, "Would you like to know what I had on my piano during the two months gestation of the Concerto? The concertos of Mozart, those of Liszt, that of Ravel, and your Partita".

Instrumentation
The concerto is scored for two pianos and an orchestra of flute, piccolo, two oboes (second doubling cor anglais), two clarinets, two bassoons, two horns, two trumpets, two trombones, tuba, snare drum, shallow snare drum, bass drum, castanets, triangle, military drum, suspended cymbal, and strings.

Style and form
The concerto features simple ABA form in the first and second movements, but suggests a more complex rondo form with intervening episodes in the finale. The concerto is in three movements as follows:
Allegro ma non troppo – in D minor. Poulenc chooses to bypass the conventions of sonata allegro in the opening movement in favor of ternary form, with a slower middle section. If this first movement is meant to evoke Mozart, it is the blithe composer of the delightful Divertimenti and Serenades. The general effect is "gay and direct", words Poulenc often used to describe his own music.
Larghetto – in B-flat major. In the gently rocking, consciously naive Larghetto, Poulenc evokes the famous Andante from Mozart's D Minor Concerto, K. 466. The increasingly sonorous, steadily building middle section echoes the spirit of Camille Saint-Saëns, who, though indefatigably French, could in his serious moments be among the most Mozartean of 19th-century composers. Poulenc commented, "In the Larghetto of this Concerto I permitted myself, for the first theme, to return to Mozart, because I have a fondness for the melodic line and I prefer Mozart to all other musicians. If the movement begins alla Mozart, it quickly diverges at the entrance of the second piano, toward a style that was familiar to me at the time."
Allegro molto – in D minor. Poulenc's finale is a syncretic Rondo that merges the insouciance of a Parisian music hall and the mesmerizing sonorities of a gamelan orchestra. Its scintillating patter and energetic rhythms produce a vivacious, effervescent effect. As did his idol Mozart, Poulenc favors us with profligate melodious invention, featuring a new theme for nearly each succeeding section. His biographer Henri Hell has observed, "the finale flirts with one of those deliberately vulgar themes never far from the composer's heart."

As brilliant as it sounds, the Poulenc Concerto for Two Pianos demands of its piano soloists more skills of ensemble than of technique. Although the pianos intersperse conversational interludes, conventional cadenzas are absent. Throughout the concerto, the pianists play nearly continuously, sometimes unaccompanied by the orchestra. Poulenc creates a dramatic yet charming dialogue between the two keyboards and the supporting orchestra ensemble. Unusually, his orchestration foregrounds the woodwinds, brass and percussion, relegating the strings to an unfamiliar secondary role.

Quotes

References

Bibliography

External links 
 Pianopedia page 
 San Francisco Symphony program notes 
 CSO program notes 
 Classical Archives page 
 New World Symphony program notes 

Poulenc
Compositions by Francis Poulenc
1932 compositions
Compositions in D minor